Hand sanitizer (also known as hand antiseptic, hand disinfectant, hand rub, or handrub) is a liquid, gel or foam generally used to kill many viruses/bacteria/microorganisms on the hands. In most settings, hand washing with soap and water is generally preferred. Hand sanitizer is less effective at killing certain kinds of germs, such as norovirus and Clostridium difficile, and unlike hand washing, it cannot physically remove harmful chemicals. People may incorrectly wipe off hand sanitizer before it has dried, and some are less effective because their alcohol concentrations are too low.

Alcohol-based hand sanitizer that is at least 60% (v/v) alcohol in water (specifically, ethanol or isopropyl alcohol/isopropanol (rubbing alcohol)) is recommended by the United States Centers for Disease Control and Prevention (CDC), but only if soap and water are not available. The CDC recommends the following steps when using an alcohol-based hand sanitizer:

 Apply product to the palm of one hand.
 Rub hands together.
 Rub the product over all surfaces of hands and fingers until hands are dry.
 Do not go near flame or gas burner or any burning object during application of hand sanitizer.

In most healthcare settings, alcohol-based hand sanitizers are preferable to hand washing with soap and water, because it may be better tolerated and is more effective at reducing bacteria. Hand washing with soap and water, however, should be carried out if contamination can be seen, or following the use of the toilet. The general use of non-alcohol-based hand sanitizers is not recommended.

Alcohol-based versions typically contain some combination of isopropyl alcohol, ethanol (ethyl alcohol), or n-propanol, with versions containing 60% to 95% alcohol the most effective. Care should be taken as they are flammable. Alcohol-based hand sanitizer works against a wide variety of microorganisms but not spores. Compounds such as glycerol may be added to prevent drying of the skin. Some versions contain fragrances; however, these are discouraged due to the risk of allergic reactions. Non-alcohol based versions typically contain benzalkonium chloride or triclosan; but are less effective than alcohol-based ones.

Alcohol has been used as an antiseptic at least as early as 1363 with evidence to support its use becoming available in the late 1800s. Alcohol-based hand sanitizer has been commonly used in Europe since at least the 1980s. The alcohol-based version is on the World Health Organization's List of Essential Medicines.

History

Uses

General public

Alcohol-based hand sanitizers may not be effective if the hands are greasy or visibly soiled. In hospitals, the hands of healthcare workers are often contaminated with pathogens, but rarely soiled or greasy. In community settings, on the other hand, grease and soiling is common from activities such as handling food, playing sports, gardening, and being active outdoors. Similarly, contaminants like heavy metals and pesticides (generally found outdoors) cannot be removed by hand sanitizers. Hand sanitizers might also be swallowed by children, especially if brightly colored.

Some commercially available hand sanitizers (and online recipes for homemade rubs) have alcohol concentrations that are too low. This makes them less effective at killing germs. Poorer people in developed countries and people in developing countries may find it harder to get a hand sanitizer with an effective alcohol concentration. Fraudulent labelling of alcohol concentrations has been a problem in Guyana.

Schools 
The current evidence for the effectiveness of school hand hygiene interventions is of poor quality.

In a 2020 Cochrane review comparing rinse-free hand washing to conventional soap and water techniques and the subsequent impact on school absenteeism found a small but beneficial effect on rinse-free hand washing on illness related absenteeism.

Health care

Hand sanitizers were first introduced in 1966 in medical settings such as hospitals and healthcare facilities. The product was popularized in the early 1990s.

Alcohol-based hand sanitizer is more convenient compared to hand washing with soap and water in most situations in the healthcare setting. Among healthcare workers, it is generally more effective for hand antisepsis, and better tolerated than soap and water. Hand washing should still be carried out if contamination can be seen or following the use of the toilet.

Hand sanitizer that contains at least 60% alcohol or contains a "persistent antiseptic" should be used. Alcohol rubs kill many different kinds of bacteria, including antibiotic resistant bacteria and TB bacteria. They also kill many kinds of viruses, including the flu virus, the common cold virus, coronaviruses, and HIV.

90% alcohol rubs are more effective against viruses than most other forms of hand washing. Isopropyl alcohol will kill 99.99% or more of all non-spore forming bacteria in less than 30 seconds, both in the laboratory and on human skin.

In too low quantities (0.3 ml) or concentrations (below 60%), the alcohol in hand sanitizers may not have the 10–15 seconds exposure time required to denature proteins and lyse cells. In environments with high lipids or protein waste (such as food processing), the use of alcohol hand rubs alone may not be sufficient to ensure proper hand hygiene.

For health care settings, like hospitals and clinics, optimum alcohol concentration to kill bacteria is 70% to 95%. Products with alcohol concentrations as low as 40% are available in American stores, according to researchers at East Tennessee State University.

Alcohol rub sanitizers kill most bacteria, and fungi, and stop some viruses.  Alcohol rub sanitizers containing at least 70% alcohol (mainly ethyl alcohol) kill 99.9% of the bacteria on hands 30 seconds after application and 99.99% to 99.999% in one minute.

For health care, optimal disinfection requires attention to all exposed surfaces such as around the fingernails, between the fingers, on the back of the thumb, and around the wrist.  Hand alcohol should be thoroughly rubbed into the hands and on the lower forearm for a duration of at least 30 seconds and then allowed to air dry.

Use of alcohol-based hand gels dries skin less, leaving more moisture in the epidermis, than hand washing with antiseptic/antimicrobial soap and water.

Hand sanitizers containing a minimum of 60 to 95% alcohol are efficient germ killers. Alcohol rub sanitizers kill bacteria, multi-drug resistant bacteria (MRSA and VRE), tuberculosis, and some viruses (including HIV, herpes, RSV, rhinovirus, vaccinia, influenza, and hepatitis) and fungi. Alcohol rub sanitizers containing 70% alcohol kill 99.97% (3.5 log reduction, similar to 35 decibel reduction) of the bacteria on hands 30 seconds after application and 99.99% to 99.999% (4 to 5 log reduction) of the bacteria on hands 1 minute after application.

Drawbacks
There are certain situations during which hand washing with soap and water are preferred over hand sanitizer, these include: eliminating bacterial spores of Clostridioides difficile, parasites such as Cryptosporidium, and certain viruses like norovirus depending on the concentration of alcohol in the sanitizer (95% alcohol was seen to be most effective in eliminating most viruses). In addition, if hands are contaminated with fluids or other visible contaminates, hand washing is preferred as well as after using the toilet and if discomfort develops from the residue of alcohol sanitizer use.  Furthermore, CDC states hand sanitizers are not effective in removing chemicals such as pesticides.

Safety

Fire
Alcohol gel can catch fire, producing a translucent blue flame.  This is due to the flammable alcohol in the gel.  Some hand sanitizer gels may not produce this effect due to a high concentration of water or moisturizing agents. There have been some rare instances where alcohol has been implicated in starting fires in the operating room, including a case where alcohol used as an antiseptic pooled under the surgical drapes in an operating room and caused a fire when a cautery instrument was used. Alcohol gel was not implicated.

To minimize the risk of fire, alcohol rub users are instructed to rub their hands until dry, which indicates that the flammable alcohol has evaporated. Igniting alcohol hand rub while using it is rare, but the need for this is underlined by one case of a health care worker using hand rub, removing a polyester isolation gown, and then touching a metal door while her hands were still wet; static electricity produced an audible spark and ignited the hand gel. Fire departments suggest refills for the alcohol-based hand sanitizers can be stored with cleaning supplies away from heat sources or open flames.

Skin
Research shows that alcohol hand sanitizers don't  pose any risk by eliminating beneficial microorganisms that are naturally present on the skin. The body quickly replenishes the beneficial microbes on the hands, often moving them in from just up the arms where there are fewer harmful microorganisms.

However, alcohol may strip the skin of the outer layer of oil, which may have negative effects on barrier function of the skin. A study also shows that disinfecting hands with an antimicrobial detergent results in a greater barrier disruption of skin compared to alcohol solutions, suggesting an increased loss of skin lipids.

Frequent use of alcohol-based hand sanitizers can cause dry skin unless emollients and/or skin moisturizers are added to the formula. The drying effect of alcohol can be reduced or eliminated by adding glycerin and/or other emollients to the formula. In clinical trials, alcohol-based hand sanitizers containing emollients caused substantially less skin irritation and dryness than soaps or antimicrobial detergents. Allergic contact dermatitis, contact urticaria syndrome or hypersensitivity to alcohol or additives present in alcohol hand rubs rarely occur. The lower tendency to induce irritant contact dermatitis became an attraction as compared to soap and water hand washing.

Ingestion
In the United States, the U.S. Food and Drug Administration (FDA) controls antimicrobial handsoaps and sanitizers as over-the-counter drugs (OTC) because they are intended for topical anti-microbial use to prevent disease in humans.

The FDA requires strict labeling which informs consumers on proper use of this OTC drug and dangers to avoid, including warning adults not to ingest, not to use in the eyes, to keep out of the reach of children, and to allow use by children only under adult supervision. According to the American Association of Poison Control Centers, there were nearly 12,000 cases of hand sanitizer ingestion in 2006. If ingested, alcohol-based hand sanitizers can cause alcohol poisoning in small children. However, the U.S. Centers for Disease Control recommends using hand sanitizer with children to promote good hygiene, under supervision, and furthermore recommends parents pack hand sanitizer for their children when traveling, to avoid their contracting disease from dirty hands.

People with alcoholism may attempt to consume hand sanitizer in desperation when traditional alcoholic beverages are unavailable, or personal access to them is restricted by force or law. There have been reported incidents of people drinking the gel in prisons and hospitals to become intoxicated. As a result, access to sanitizing liquids and gels is controlled and restricted in some facilities. For example, over a period of several weeks during the COVID-19 pandemic in New Mexico, seven people in that U.S. state who were alcoholic were severely injured by drinking sanitizer: three died, three were in critical condition, and one was left permanently blind.

In 2021, a dozen children were hospitalized in the state of Maharashtra, India, after they were mistakenly orally administered hand sanitizer instead of a polio vaccine.

Absorption
On 30 April 2015, the FDA announced that they were requesting more scientific data based on the safety of hand sanitizer. Emerging science suggests that for at least some health care antiseptic active ingredients, systemic exposure (full body exposure as shown by detection of antiseptic ingredients in the blood or urine) is higher than previously thought, and existing data raise potential concerns about the effects of repeated daily human exposure to some antiseptic active ingredients. This would include hand antiseptic products containing alcohol and triclosan.

Surgical hand disinfection 

Hands must be disinfected before any surgical procedure by hand washing with mild soap and then hand-rubbing with a sanitizer. Surgical disinfection requires a larger dose of the hand-rub and a longer rubbing time than is ordinarily used.  It is usually done in two applications according to specific hand-rubbing techniques, EN1499 (hygienic handwash), and EN 1500 (hygienic hand disinfection) to ensure that antiseptic is applied everywhere on the surface of the hand.

Alcohol-free 
Some hand sanitizer products use agents other than alcohol to kill microorganisms, such as povidone-iodine, benzalkonium chloride or triclosan. The World Health Organization (WHO) and the CDC recommends "persistent" antiseptics for hand sanitizers. Persistent activity is defined as the prolonged or extended antimicrobial activity that prevents or inhibits the proliferation or survival of microorganisms after application of the product. This activity may be demonstrated by sampling a site several minutes or hours after application and demonstrating bacterial antimicrobial effectiveness when compared with a baseline level. This property also has been referred to as "residual activity." Both substantive and nonsubstantive active ingredients can show a persistent effect if they substantially lower the number of bacteria during the wash period.

Laboratory studies have shown lingering benzalkonium chloride may be associated with antibiotic resistance in MRSA. Tolerance to alcohol sanitizers may develop in fecal bacteria. Where alcohol sanitizers utilize 62%, or higher, alcohol by weight, only 0.1 to 0.13% of benzalkonium chloride by weight provides equivalent antimicrobial effectiveness.

Triclosan has been shown to accumulate in biosolids in the environment, one of the top seven organic contaminants in waste water according to the National Toxicology Program Triclosan leads to various problems with natural biological systems, and triclosan, when combined with chlorine e.g. from tap water, produces dioxins, a probable carcinogen in humans. However, 90–98% of triclosan in waste water biodegrades by both photolytic or natural biological processes or is removed due to sorption in waste water treatment plants. Numerous studies show that only very small traces are detectable in the effluent water that reaches rivers.

A series of studies show that photodegradation of triclosan produced 2,4-dichlorophenol and 2,8-dichlorodibenzo-p-dioxin (2,8-DCDD). The 2,4-dichlorophenol itself is known to be biodegradable as well as photodegradable. For DCDD, one of the non-toxic compounds of the dioxin family, a conversion rate of 1% has been reported and estimated half-lives suggest that it is photolabile as well. The formation-decay kinetics of DCDD are also reported by Sanchez-Prado et al. (2006) who claim "transformation of triclosan to toxic dioxins has never been shown and is highly unlikely."

Alcohol-free hand sanitizers may be effective immediately while on the skin, but the solutions themselves can become contaminated because alcohol is an in-solution preservative and without it, the alcohol-free solution itself is susceptible to contamination. However, even alcohol-containing hand sanitizers can become contaminated if the alcohol content is not properly controlled or the sanitizer is grossly contaminated with microorganisms during manufacture. In June 2009, alcohol-free Clarcon Antimicrobial Hand Sanitizer was pulled from the US market by the FDA, which found the product contained gross contamination of extremely high levels of various bacteria, including those which can "cause opportunistic infections of the skin and underlying tissues and could result in medical or surgical attention as well as permanent damage".  Gross contamination of any hand sanitizer by bacteria during manufacture will result in the failure of the effectiveness of that sanitizer and possible infection of the treatment site with the contaminating organisms.

Types 
Alcohol-based hand rubs are extensively used in the hospital environment as an alternative to antiseptic soaps. Hand-rubs in the hospital environment have two applications: hygienic hand rubbing and surgical hand disinfection. Alcohol based hand rubs provide a better skin tolerance as compared to antiseptic soap.
Hand rubs also prove to have more effective microbiological properties as compared to antiseptic soaps.

The same ingredients used in over-the-counter hand-rubs are also used in hospital hand-rubs: alcohols such as ethanol and isopropanol, sometimes combined with quaternary ammonium cations (quats) such as benzalkonium chloride.  Quats are added at levels up to 200 parts per million to increase antimicrobial effectiveness. Although allergy to alcohol-only rubs is rare, fragrances, preservatives and quats can cause contact allergies.  These other ingredients do not evaporate like alcohol and accumulate leaving a "sticky" residue until they are removed with soap and water.

The most common brands of alcohol hand rubs include Aniosgel, Avant, Sterillium, Desderman and Allsept S. All hospital hand rubs must conform to certain regulations like EN 12054 for hygienic treatment and surgical disinfection by hand-rubbing. Products with a claim of "99.99% reduction" or 4-log reduction are ineffective in hospital environment, since the reduction must be more than "99.99%".

The hand sanitizer dosing systems for hospitals are designed to deliver a measured amount of the product for staff.  They are dosing pumps screwed onto a bottle or are specially designed dispensers with refill bottles. Dispensers for surgical hand disinfection are usually equipped with elbow controlled mechanism or infrared sensors to avoid any contact with the pump.

Composition

Consumer alcohol-based hand sanitizers, and health care "hand alcohol" or "alcohol hand antiseptic agents" exist in liquid, foam, and easy-flowing gel formulations. Products with 60% to 95% alcohol by volume are effective antiseptics. Lower or higher concentrations are less effective; most products contain between 60% and 80% alcohol.

In addition to alcohol (ethanol, isopropanol or n-Propanol), hand sanitizers also contain the following:
 additional antiseptics such as chlorhexidine and quaternary ammonium derivatives,
 sporicides such as hydrogen peroxides that eliminate bacterial spores that may be present in ingredients,
 emollients and gelling agents to reduce skin dryness and irritation,
 a small amount of sterile or distilled water,
 sometimes foaming agents, colorants or fragrances.

WHO formulations 
The World Health Organization has published the following formulations to guide to the production of large quantities of hand sanitizer from chemicals available in developing countries, where commercial hand sanitizer may not be available:

Formulation 1

Formulation 2

Production

COVID-19 pandemic

In 2010 the World Health Organization produced a guide for manufacturing hand sanitizer, which received renewed interest in 2020 because of shortages of hand sanitizer in the wake of the COVID-19 pandemic.  Dozens of liquor and perfume manufacturers switched their manufacturing facilities from their normal product to hand sanitizer. In order to keep up with the demand, local distilleries started using their alcohol to make hand sanitizer. Distilleries producing hand sanitizer originally existed in a legal grey area in the United States, until the Alcohol and Tobacco Tax and Trade Bureau declared that distilleries could produce their sanitizer without authorization.

In the beginnings of the pandemic, because of hand sanitizer shortages due to panic buying, people resorted to using 60% to 99% concentrations of isopropyl or ethyl alcohol for hand sanitization, typically mixing them with glycerol or soothing moisturizers or liquid contain aloe vera to counteract irritations with options of adding drops of lemon or lime juice or essential oils for scents, and thus making DIY hand sanitizers. However, there are cautions against making them, such as a wrong measurement or ingredient may resulting in an insufficient amount of alcohol to kill the coronavirus, thus rendering the mixture ineffective or even poisonous.

Additionally, some commercial products are dangerous, either due to poor oversight and process control, or fraudulent motive. In June 2020, the FDA issued an advisory against use of hand sanitizer products manufacture by Eskbiochem SA de CV in Mexico due to excessive levels of methanol – up to 81% in one product. Methanol can be absorbed through the skin, is toxic in modest amounts, and in substantial exposure can result in "nausea, vomiting, headache, blurred vision, permanent blindness, seizures, coma, permanent damage to the nervous system or death". Products suspected of manufacture by Eskbiochem SA with excessive methanol have been reported as far away as British Columbia, Canada.

In August 2020, the FDA expanded the list of dangerous hand sanitizers.

See also
 List of cleaning products

Notes

Sources

External links

 

Antiseptics
Disinfectants
Medical hygiene
Personal hygiene products
Skin care
World Health Organization essential medicines
Wikipedia medicine articles ready to translate
Hand
Dispensers